604 is the year 604 AD.

604 may also refer to:

604 (number)
604 (album), an album by Ladytron
Goa trance, a style of Trance music, is often referred to as "604"
Area code 604, an area code in southwestern British Columbia, Canada
Peugeot 604, a car
604 Records, a record label owned by Nickelback lead singer Chad Kroeger
IBM 604, a programmable punch card electronic calculator
PowerPC 604, a PowerPC processor
Socket 604, for Intel Xeon processors
Archos Generation 4, a Portable Video Player
604, a song by Anthrax on their album Volume 8: The Threat Is Real
Glasflügel 604, glider